The Bayanhaote Basin, also known as Bayanhot Basin, is a geographic region located in the west-central part of Inner Mongolia Autonomous Region. It is a superimposed basin that 
underwent a long-term sedimentary evolution process from transgression to retrogression during the Carboniferous to Late Permian.

The Bayanhot Basin is a composite and superimposed basin developed in the crossing zone of the Qinlin-Qilian-Helan trifurcate rift system (秦、祁、贺三叉裂谷系) during the beginning of Early Palaeozoic Era (早古生代早期) of  crossover zone.

It has been a self-flowing tectonic basin since the Mesozoic.  In the early 1950s, oil and gas exploration in this area began.

References

Landforms of Asia
Landforms of Inner Mongolia
Basins of Asia
Geography of Asia
Geography of Inner Mongolia